Suzanne Lang is an American author of children's books and a television producer. She frequently partners with illustrator Max Lang, her husband.

Her book Grumpy Monkey, published in 2018, debuted at #8 on The New York Times bestseller list, reaching #1. The book spent 25 weeks on the list. Grumpy Monkey Party Time followed in 2019.

Selected works

Grumpy Monkey

References

External links 
 

Year of birth missing (living people)
Living people
American children's writers